Ijurin Ekiti is a town in Ijero local government area of Ekiti State, Nigeria. It is one of the towns in the old Ijero kingdom which migrated from Ile Ife settling at different locations, before settling at this present location.

References 

Local Government Areas in Ekiti State